Luis Alberto Edwards Vives (25 November 1874 in Valparaíso – 3 April 1932 in Santiago) was a Chilean historian, nationalist politician and lawyer. He was a member of the influential Edwards family. His most famous work (highly influenced by Oswald Spengler and the German Conservative Revolution) was La fronda aristocrática en Chile (1928). This analyzed the history of Chile in the 19th century as a conflict between the authoritarian state and the aristocracy.

Politician 
Edwards was member of the National (Montt-Varist) Party, and its deputy from 1909 to 1912 representing Valparaíso and Casablanca. In 1915 he founded the Nationalist Party along with Francisco Antonio Encina and Guillermo Subercaseaux.

Edwards served as a Minister of Finance in the presidency of Emiliano Figueroa Larraín from November 1926 to February 1927. During the government of Carlos Ibáñez del Campo, a proto-fascist president, he headed several Ministries: Education from October 1930 to April 1931; Foreign Affairs in July 1931; and Justice in late 1931.

References 

1874 births
1932 deaths
People from Valparaíso
Alberto
Chilean people of English descent
National Party (Chile, 1857) politicians
Chilean Ministers of Finance
Foreign ministers of Chile
Chilean Ministers of Education
Chilean Ministers of Justice
Deputies of the XXIX Legislative Period of the National Congress of Chile
19th-century Chilean historians
20th-century Chilean historians
20th-century Chilean male writers